This is a list of listed buildings in the Falkirk council area. The list is split out by parish.

 List of listed buildings in Abercorn, Falkirk
 List of listed buildings in Airth, Falkirk
 List of listed buildings in Bo'Ness And Carriden, Falkirk
 List of listed buildings in Bo'Ness, Falkirk
 List of listed buildings in Denny And Dunipace, Falkirk
 List of listed buildings in Denny, Falkirk
 List of listed buildings in Dunipace, Falkirk
 List of listed buildings in Falkirk, Falkirk
 List of listed buildings in Grangemouth, Falkirk
 List of listed buildings in Larbert, Falkirk
 List of listed buildings in Muiravonside, Falkirk
 List of listed buildings in Slamannan, Falkirk

Falkirk (council area)